P. eques may refer to:
 Psittacula eques, a parakeet species
 Polypedates eques, a frog species endemic to Sri Lanka

See also
 Eques (disambiguation)